Puerto Rico Highway 24 (PR-24)  is a north–south road located between Cataño and Guaynabo. This highway extends from Avenida Las Nereidas (PR-888), in downtown Cataño, to Avenida El Caño (PR-165), near the Metropolitan Detention Center, Guaynabo. In Cataño, it is known as Calle Wilson, and in Guaynabo, as Avenida Juan Ponce de León.

Major intersections

See also

 List of highways numbered 24

References

External links
 

024